See also carne seca, a Mexican dried meat.

Carne-seca ('dried meat' in Portuguese) is a kind of dried, salted meat, usually beef, in Brazilian cuisine.

Carne seca is a frequent accompaniment to black beans.

See also

 List of dried foods

References

Brazilian cuisine
Dried meat